That's Right is a studio album by American musician George Benson. It was released through GRP Records on July 30, 1996. That's Right was Benson's first album released with the label after twenty years on Warner Bros. Records and produced by longtime producer, Tommy LiPuma. The cover photograph is by Andy Earl and captures Benson in Burnaby Street, Chelsea, London.

Critical reception

AllMusic editor Thom Owens wrote that "like his other '90s albums, That's Right is jazz-inflected quiet-storm soul. It's quietly funky and always grooving, whether he's playing a light uptempo number or a silky ballad. As always, Benson's tone is smooth and supple – it's a pleasure to hear him play, even if the material he has selected doesn't always showcase his ample skills. In fact, the unevenness in material is the very thing that keeps That's Right from being on par with Benson's early '80s contemporary soul records."

Track listing
 "That's Right" (Michael White, Ron Smith) - 5:02
 "The Thinker" (Bob Ward, Gary Haase) - 5:37
 "Marvin Said" (George Benson) - 5:20
 "True Blue" (Adam Falcon, Trevor Gale) - 5:06
 "Holdin' On" (Gary Brown) - 5:32
 "Song for My Brother" (Paul Peterson) - 4:16
 "Johnnie Lee" (George Benson) - 5:37
 "Summer Love" (Curtis Williams, Gary Brown) - 4:37
 "P Park" (George Benson, Ricky Peterson) - 4:50
 "Footprints in the Sand" (Gary Brown) - 3:45

UK and Japanese bonus tracks
 "When Love Comes Calling" (Jean-Paul Maunick, Max Beesley) - 6:39
 "Where Are You Now?" (Damon Banks, Gary Brown, Tom Keane) - 5:38

Personnel and credits 
Musicians

 George Benson – vocals, guitar
 Ricky Peterson – keyboards (1-9, 11, 12)
 Joe Mardin – keyboards (5, 8, 12)
 Curtis Williams – keyboards (8)
 Robbie Buchanan – keyboards (10), arrangements (10, 11)
 Max Beesley – keyboards (11)
 Graham Harvey – acoustic piano (11)
 Tom Keane – keyboards (12)
 Paul Peterson – guitar (1-4, 6, 7, 9), bass (1-4, 6, 7, 9)
 Julian Crampton – bass (11)
 Michael Bland – drums (1-7, 9, 12)
 Richard Bull – drums (11), percussion (11)
 Jean-Paul 'Bluey' Maunick – drum programming (11)
 Ralph MacDonald – percussion (3)
 Paulinho da Costa – percussion (6)
 Eric Leeds – saxophone (9)
 Bud Beadle – saxophones (11), flute (11)
 Fayyaz Virji – trombone (11)
 Kevin Robinson – trumpet (11)
 Simon Hale – string arrangements (10)
 Nikki Richards – backing vocals (8)
 Mark Anthoni – backing vocals (11)
 Joy Malcolm – backing vocals (11)

Production

 Executive Producer – Tommy LiPuma
 Producers – Ricky Peterson and Tommy LiPuma (Tracks 1-4, 6, 7 & 9); Joe Mardin (Tracks 5, 8 & 12); Jean-Paul Maunick (Tracks 10 & 11); Robbie Buchanan (Co-producer on Tracks 10 & 11).
 Engineers – Tom Tucker (Tracks 1-4, 6, 7 & 9); Rod Hui (Tracks 5, 8 & 12); Simon Cotsworth and John Gallen (Tracks 10 & 11).
 Tracks 1-4, 6, 7 & 9 recorded at Paisley Park Studios (Chanhassen, MN).
 Tracks 5, 8 & 12 recorded at Soundtrack Studios, Greene Street Recording Studios and Broadway Productions (New York, NY).
 Tracks 10 & 11 recorded at Whittfield Street Studio (London, UK).
 Tracks 1-4, 6, 7, 9, 10 & 11 mixed by Bill Schnee
 Mastered by Arnie Acosta, Gavin Lurssen and Doug Sax at The Mastering Lab (Los Angeles, CA).
 Design – Laurie Goldman and Robin Lynch
 Photography – Andy Earl

Charts

References

George Benson albums
1996 albums
GRP Records albums
Albums produced by Tommy LiPuma